The Way We Move is the fifth studio album by the New York-based folk singer Langhorne Slim. It was originally crowd-funded by the artist and his band. Was selected as the Vinyl Me, Please album for January, 2013.

Track listing
(From Amazon)
 The Way We Move
 Bad Luck 
 Fire 
 Salvation 
 On the Attack 
 Someday 
 Great Divide 
 Just a Dream 
 Song for Sid 
 Found My Heart 
 Wild Soul 
 Two Crooked Hearts 
 Coffee Cups 
 Past Lives

Personnel

Band members
Langhorne Slim – vocals, guitars
David Moore – piano, keyboards, banjos, guitars, vocals
Jeff Ratner – basses, vocals
Malachi DeLorenzo – drums, percussion, vocals

Other crew 
Sam Duffy – fiddle
Kenny Warren – trumpet
Jeremy Viner – tenor saxophone, clarinet
Andrew Carrico – baritone saxophone
Sam Kulik – trombone

Charts

References

2012 albums
Langhorne Slim albums